Keemat may refer to:
Keemat (1946 film), a Bollywood film
Keemat (1973 film), a 1973 Bollywood film starring Dharmendra and Rekha
Keemat – They Are Back, a 1998 Bollywood film